The 1994 Phillip Island ATCC round was the fourth round of the 1994 Australian Touring Car Championship. It was held on the weekend of 8 to 10 April at Phillip Island Grand Prix Circuit in Phillip Island, Victoria.

Race results

Qualifying 
Peter Brock took his first pole position of the year and the second for the Holden Racing Team. Just one-tenth behind was John Bowe and two-tenths behind was team-mate, Tomas Mezera.

Peter Jackson Dash 
Alan Jones came from the back of the grid to win the Peter Jackson Dash and take the front row slot for the first race. John Bowe maintained second position as Peter Brock fell through the pack to fifth.

Race 1 
Before the start of the race, the rain started to descend upon the circuit. Some drivers opted to pull into the pits for wet tyres before the start of the race, whilst others gambled on the rain dissipating and track drying up. However, even before the first lap was finished, the drivers on wet tyres had overtaken most of the pack. Soon, everyone was struggling in the tricky conditions, with drivers such as Mark Skaife spinning off the circuit. Though, whilst plagued by the spin, Skaife began to charge up the field and soon found himself bearing down on race leader, Glenn Seton. However, it was not enough and Glenn Seton had won his first race of the 1994 season with Skaife in second and Alan Jones in third.

Race 2 
With the rain gone, a different race played out. Though the damp track conditions caught out drivers such as Larry Perkins and Alan Jones, it was plain sailing for Glenn Seton as he took his second win of the season with Peter Brock in second and Mark Skaife in third.

Championship Standings 

Drivers' Championship standings

References

External links 

Phillip Island